Kulmetovo (Qolmät) is a rural locality (a village) in Yelanlinsky Selsoviet, Kiginsky District, Bashkortostan, Russia. The population was 293 as of 2010. There are 5 streets.

Geography 
Kulmetovo is located 41 km south of Verkhniye Kigi (the district's administrative centre) by road. Alexeyevka is the nearest rural locality.

References 

Rural localities in Kiginsky District